The 2014 Team Speedway Junior World Championship was the tenth FIM Team Under-21 World Championship season. The final took place on 23 August 2014 in Slangerup, Denmark.

Poland won their seventh Team Under-21 World Championship.

Semi-finals

Final 
  Slangerup
23 August 2014

Scores

See also 
 2014 Speedway World Cup
 2014 Individual Speedway Junior World Championship

References 

2014
World Team Junior